Core values may refer to:

Core values, the most important principles, the first value category of the value system
Core democratic values
Family values
The core values of many military organizations:
Core values of the United States Marine Corps
Core values of the United States Navy
US Air Force Core Values
U.S. Coast Guard Core Values